Lorenzo Migliorelli (born 3 May 1998) is an Italian football player.

Club career

Atalanta

Loan to Venezia
On 9 July 2018, he joined Serie B club Venezia on a two-year loan. He did not make any appearances for Venezia in the first half of the 2018–19 season, and the loan was terminated early on 25 January 2019.

Loan to Virtus Entella
On the same day, he joined Virtus Entella on loan. He made his Serie C debut for Virtus on 27 January 2019 in a game against Cuneo, as a 64th-minute substitute for Carlo Crialese.

Loan to Siena
On 11 July 2019, he joined Siena on loan.

Gubbio
On 19 August 2020 he joined Gubbio. On 13 January 2022, his contract was terminated by mutual consent.

References

External links
 

1998 births
Footballers from Brescia
Living people
Italian footballers
Association football defenders
Venezia F.C. players
Virtus Entella players
A.C.N. Siena 1904 players
A.S. Gubbio 1910 players
Serie C players